This is a list of Barbadian writers, including writers either from or associated with Barbados.

A
 Adisa Andwele

B
 Hilary Beckles (born 1955)
 Woodie Blackman (1922–2010)
 Kamau Brathwaite (1930–2020)

C
 Thomas Chenery (1826–1884) 
 Austin Clarke (novelist) (1934–2016)
 Frank Collymore (1893–1980)
 Tony Cozier (1940–2016)
 Alissandra Cummins (born 1958)

D
 Linda M. Deane
 Geoffrey Drayton (1924–2017)

G
 Wyndham Gittens (1885–1967)

K
 Agymah Kamau
 Anthony Kellman (born 1955)
 Odimumba Kwamdela (1942–2019)

L
 George Lamming (1927–2022)
 Charles Leslie (writer)
 Karen Lord (born 1968)
 Glenville Lovell (born 1955)

M
 Carl Moore
 Richard B. Moore (1893–1978)

P
 Esther Phillips (born 1950)
 Samuel Jackman Prescod (1806–1871)

S
 Irene Sandiford-Garner (born 1961)
 Dorothea Smartt (born 1963)
 Andrea Stuart (born 1962)

W
 Eric D. Walrond (1898–1966)
 Clennell Wickham (1895–1938)
 Cynthia Wilson (born 1934)

References

 
Barbadian